Chhatrapati Shivaji Maharaj Vastu Sangrahalaya, (CSMVS) originally named Prince of Wales Museum of Western India, is a museum in Mumbai (Bombay) which documents the history of India from prehistoric to modern times.

It was founded during British rule of India in the early years of the 20th century by prominent citizens of the city then called Bombay, with the help of the government, to commemorate the visit of the Prince of Wales (later George V, king of the United Kingdom and emperor of India). It is located in the heart of South Mumbai near the Gateway of India. The museum was renamed in 1998 after Chhatrapati Shivaji Maharaj, the founder of the Maratha Empire.

The building is built in the Indo-Saracenic style of architecture, incorporating elements of other styles of architecture like the Mughal, Maratha and Jain. The museum building is surrounded by a garden of palm trees and formal flower beds.

The museum houses approximately 50,000 exhibits of ancient Indian history as well as objects from foreign lands, categorised primarily into three sections: Art, Archaeology and Natural History. The museum houses Indus Valley civilization artefacts, and other relics from ancient India from the time of the Guptas, Mauryas, Chalukyas and Rashtrakuta.

History

In 1904, some leading citizens of Bombay decided to provide a museum to commemorate the visit of the Prince of Wales, the future King George V. On 14 August 1905, the committee passed a resolution saying:

"The museum building embodies the pomp and height at which the British raj was moving ahead with their ambitious plans, in building the great metropolis Bombay". "In keeping pace with the best style of local architecture, many buildings were built, among which, Bombay High Court building, and later, Gateway of India buildings were the most notable ones".

The foundation stone was laid by the Prince of Wales on 11 November 1905 and the museum was formally named "Prince of Wales Museum of Western India". On 1 March 1907, the government of the Bombay Presidency granted the museum committee a piece of land called the "Crescent Site", where the museum now stands. Following an open design competition, in 1909 the architect George Wittet was commissioned to design the Museum building. Wittet had already worked on the design of the General Post Office and in 1911 would design one of Mumbai's most famous landmarks, the Gateway of India.

The museum was funded by the Royal Visit (1905) Memorial Funds. Additionally, the Government and the Municipality granted Rs. 300,000 and Rs. 250,000 respectively. Sir Currimbhoy Ibrahim (first Baronet) donated another Rs. 300,000 and Sir Cowasji Jehangir gave Rs. 50,000. The Museum was established under Bombay Act No. III of 1909. The museum is now maintained by annual grants from the Government and the Bombay Municipal Corporation. The latter pays for these grants from the interest accruing on the funds at the disposal of the Trust of the Museum.

The museum building was completed in 1915, but was used as a Children's Welfare Centre and a Military Hospital during the First World War, before being handed over to the committee in 1920. The Prince of Wales Museum was inaugurated on 10 January 1922, by Lady Lloyd, the wife of George Lloyd, Governor of Bombay.

The museum building is a Grade I Heritage Building of the city and was awarded first prize (Urban Heritage Award) by the Bombay Chapter of the Indian Heritage Society for heritage building maintenance in 1990. In 1998 the Museum was renamed Chhatrapati Shivaji Maharaj Vastu Sangrahalaya after the warrior king and founder of the Maratha Empire, Shivaji. The museum was renamed after the renaming of the city in 1995, when the colonial name "Bombay" was replaced by the native "Mumbai".

Architecture
The museum building is situated in  area, having a built up area of 12,142.23m sq. It is surrounded by a garden of palm trees and formal flower beds.

The museum building, built of locally quarried grey Kurla basalt and buff coloured trachyte Malad stone. It is a three-storied rectangular structure, capped by a dome set upon a base, which adds an additional storey in the centre of the building. Built in the Western Indian and Indo-Saracenic style of architecture, the building accommodates a central entrance porch, above which rises a dome, tilled and modified well "tiled in white and blue flecks, supported on a lotus - petal base". A cluster of pinnacles, topped with miniature domes surround the central dome. The building incorporates features like Islamic dome with a finial along with protruding balconies and inlaid floors, inspired by Mughal palace architecture. The architect, George Wittet, modelled the dome on that of Golconda Fort and the inner vaulting arches on those at the Gol Gumbaz in Bijapur. The interior of the museum combines the columns, railings and balcony of an 18th-century Wada (a Maratha mansion) with Jain style interior columns, which form the main body of the central pavilion below the Maratha balcony.

In its recent modernisation programme (2008), the museum created  space for installation of five new galleries, a conservation studio, a visiting exhibition gallery and a seminar room, in the East Wing of the Museum. The museum also houses a library.

Collections

The museum collection comprises approximately 50,000 artefacts. The collection of the museum is categorised primarily into three sections: art,  archaeology and natural history.
The museum also houses a forestry section, which has specimens of timbers grown in the Bombay Presidency (British India), and one exhibiting a small local geological collection of rocks, minerals and fossils. The Maritime Heritage Gallery, which displays objects relating to navigation, is the "first of its kind in India". In 2008, the museum installed two new galleries, displaying the "Karl and Meherbai Khandalavala collection" and "the Coins of India".

Art section
The art section displays the collections of Sir Purushottam Mavji, acquired in 1915, and the art collections of Sir Ratan Tata and Sir Dorab Tata, donated in 1921 and 1933 respectively.

The museum's miniature collection encompasses representations of the main schools of Indian painting namely, Mughal, Rajasthani, Pahari and Deccani. It features palm leaf manuscripts dating to the 11th-12th centuries to the early 19th century pahari paintings, as well as paintings from the Sultanate period. Notable manuscripts housed in the museum include the Anwar-Suhayli painted in Mughal emperor Akbar’s studio and a 17th-century manuscript of the Hindu epic Ramayana from Mewar.

The ivory section has artefacts dating as early as the Gupta era. The museum also has decorative artefacts such as textiles, ivories, Mughal jades, silver, gold and artistic metal ware. It also has a collection of European paintings, Chinese and Japanese porcelain, ivory and jade artefacts. The museum also has sections dedicated to arms and armour and another to Nepali and Tibetan art. 
The arms and armour section contains a finely decorated armour of Akbar dating to 1581 CE, consisting of a steel breastplate and a shield, the former inscribed with religious verses.

Archaeological section
Sculptures and coins transferred from the Poona Museum in Pune and the collections of the Bombay branch of the Royal Asiatic Society resulted in the development of an archaeological section, with precious sculptures and epigrams. The Indus Valley Culture Gallery houses fishing hooks, weapons, ornaments and weights and measures from the Indus Valley civilization (2600–1900 BCE). Artefacts from the excavation of the Buddhist stupa of Mirpurkhas, were housed in the Museum in 1919. The sculpture collection holds Gupta (280 to 550 CE) terracotta figures from Mirpurkhas in Sind of the early 5th century, artefacts dating to the Chalukyan era (6th-12th century, Badami Chalukyas and Western Chalukyas), and sculptures of the Rashtrakuta period (753 – 982 CE) from Elephanta, near Mumbai.

Natural history section
The Bombay Natural History Society aided the Museum Trust in creating the natural history section. The museum's natural history section makes use of habitat group cases and dioramas, along with diagrams and charts, to illustrate Indian wildlife, including flamingoes, great hornbills, Indian bison, and tigers.

New galleries
An exhibition entitled Pravaha highlighting early phase of Sir J. J. School of Art and the Progressive Art Movement was launched on 24 July 2017. The exhibition covered a range of paintings from the 1880s to 1950s through works of Pestonji Bomanji, Rustom Siodia, Sawlaram Haldankar, António Xavier Trindade, S. N. Gorakshakar, Govind Mahadev Solegaonkar, G. H. Nagarkar, J. M. Ahivasi, Raghunath Dhondopant Dhopeshwarkar, Raghuveer Govind Chimulkar, Rasiklal Parikh and Y. K. Shukla, Abalal Rahiman, Keshav Bhavanrao Chudekar, Lakshman Narayan Taskar, Syed Haider Raza, and K. H. Ara.

A prints gallery was launched with an exhibition entitled Bombay to Mumbai - Door of the East with its face to the West on 29 January 2015. The gallery was inaugurated by Neil MacGregor, Director of the British Museum in London, who also gave an illustrated lecture on 'World Cultures' at the central foyer of the museum.

As part of the renovation project initiated in October 2008, the Krishna Gallery holding artworks related to the Hindu god Krishna, a Hindu deity of the preserver-god Vishnu, was opened in March 2009.

A textile gallery, the first gallery in the city, was opened in April 2010. It illustrates "various techniques of textile manufacturing, regional collections and traditional Indian costumes".

Matrika Design Collaborative is currently designing the museum's Indian miniature painting gallery. The content developed for the gallery will be converted into Braille text and tactile labels for the blind with help from designers, fabricators and consultants from the Helen Keller Institute.

A new gallery on traditional Indian jewellery will be opening in 2020. At the gallery, there will be an exhibit on Golconda diamonds - replicas of which have been presented to the museum.

Galleries
CSMVS Museum has various galleries. They are related to Art, History, Natural History and Indian Culture. They are as follows:
 Sculpture gallery
 Pre and Proto History gallery
 Natural History Section
 Indian Miniature Painting gallery
 Krishna gallery
 Himalayan Art gallery
 Decorative Metalware gallery
 House of Laxmi- Coin gallery
 Karl and Meherbai Khandalavala gallery
 Chinese and Japanese Art gallery
 Sir Ratan Tata and Sir Dorab Tata gallery of European Paintings
Arms and Armour gallery
 Jehangir Nicholson gallery
 Premchand Roychand gallery
 Key gallery
 First Floor Circle gallery
 Second Floor Circle gallery
 European Decorative Art gallery
 Bombay School gallery
 Jahangir Sabawala gallery
 Textile Gallery
 Prints gallery
 Curators gallery and Conservation Centre

Sculpture Gallery
The archaeological collections were originally started by pioneering archaeologists Sir Henry Cousens and Sir John Marshall. Amongst the important sculptures are the Gupta period terracottas and bricks from Mirpurkhas excavated by Cousens, a large number of Buddhist images from Gandhara and ceiling panels from a dilapidated temple at Aihole. The early examples are from Pauni and Pitalkhora. Mumbai itself has a rich tradition exemplified by the colossal Parel Relief of Shiva (represented here by a cast) and a Matrika from Baijanath Temple at Sewri near Parel belonging to the same phase as Elephanta. Other noteworthy images from Maharashtra are a Vishnu and a Ganesha of the eleventh century CE. Some well known sculptures are:
 Brahma, from Elephanta Caves
 Mahishasuramardini, from Elephanta
 Parel Relief of Shiva (plaster cast) from Parel
 Sculptures from Aihole and Pattadakal
 Dvarapala, from Shamalji, Gujarat
 Garuda, from the Konark Sun Temple
 Yaksha, from Pitalkhora
 Buddha and Devotee from Mirpur Khas
 Ashthamahesha Replica bust

CSMVS is celebrating its centenary

Picture gallery

References

External links 

 Museum website
 Chhatrapati Shivaji Maharaj Vastu Sangrahalaya at Google Cultural Institute

Museums in Mumbai
History museums in India
Museums established in 1922
Buildings and structures completed in 1915
1922 establishments in India
Natural history museums in India
Art museums and galleries in India
Archaeological museums in India
Monuments and memorials to Shivaji
The Victorian and Art Deco Ensemble of Mumbai
20th-century architecture in India